Rotkreuz railway station is a railway station in the municipality of Risch-Rotkreuz, in the Swiss canton of Zug. It is located at the junction of the standard gauge Rupperswil–Immensee and Zug–Lucerne lines of Swiss Federal Railways.

Services 
The following services stop at Rotkreuz:

References

External links 
 
 

Railway stations in the canton of Zug
Swiss Federal Railways stations